The 2016–17 Chattanooga Mocs basketball team represented the University of Tennessee at Chattanooga during the 2016–17 NCAA Division I men's basketball season. The Mocs, led by second-year head coach Matt McCall, played their home games at the McKenzie Arena and were members of the Southern Conference. They finished 19–12, 10–8 in SoCon play to finish for fourth place. In the SoCon tournament, they lost to Wofford in the quarterfinals.

On March 29, 2017, head coach Matt McCall left the program to take the head coaching job at UMass. On April 3, the Mocs hired Wisconsin assistant Lamont Paris as the new head coach.

Previous season
The Mocs finished the 2015–16 season 29–6, 15–3 in SoCon play to win the SoCon regular season championship. They defeated Samford, Western Carolina, and East Tennessee State to win the SoCon tournament. As a result, they received the conference's automatic bid to the NCAA tournament where they lost in the first round to Indiana.

Roster

Schedule and results

|-
!colspan=9 style=| Exhibition

|-
!colspan=9 style=| Non-conference regular season

|-
!colspan=9 style=| SoCon regular season

|-
!colspan=9 style=| SoCon tournament

See also
 2016-17 Chattanooga Mocs women's basketball

References

Chattanooga Mocs men's basketball seasons
Chattanooga
Chattanooga Mocs
Chattanooga Mocs